The Natch'l Blues is the second studio album by American blues artist Taj Mahal, released in 1968.

Track listing
All tracks composed by Taj Mahal, except where indicated:
Side 1
 "Good Morning Miss Brown" – 3:13
 "Corinna" (Mahal, Jesse Ed Davis) – 2:59
 "I Ain't Gonna Let Nobody Steal My Jellyroll" – 3:12
 "Going Up to the Country, Paint My Mailbox Blue" – 3:34
 "Done Changed My Way of Living" – 7:02

Side 2
 "She Caught the Katy and Left Me a Mule to Ride" (Mahal, Yank Rachell) – 3:27
 "The Cuckoo" (Traditional) – 4:13
 "You Don't Miss Your Water ('Til Your Well Runs Dry)" (William Bell) – 4:23
 "Ain't That a Lot of Love" (Homer Banks, Deanie Parker) – 3:59

2000 CD reissue bonus tracks
 "The Cuckoo" (Alternate Version) – 3:20
 "New Stranger Blues" – 5:38
 "Things Are Gonna Work Out Fine" – 3:15

Personnel
Taj Mahal – vocals, harmonica, Miss "National" resonator guitar
Jesse Ed Davis – guitar, piano, brass arrangements
Gary Gilmore – bass
Chuck "Brother" Blackwell – drums
Al Kooper – piano
Earl Palmer – drums

References

Taj Mahal (musician) albums
1968 albums
Albums produced by Dave Rubinson
Columbia Records albums